Joseph Salvatore "Skinny Joey" Merlino (born March 13, 1962) is an Italian-American mobster and reputed boss of the Philadelphia crime family. He rose to power in the mid-nineties after he allegedly fought a war for control of the criminal organization. He has led the crime family in gambling, loan sharking, drug trafficking, and extortion. In comparison to other traditional mob bosses who shunned the limelight, Merlino has interacted regularly with the media and the public, often openly providing charity and hosting events to benefit indigent people in Philadelphia, drawing comparisons to the similarly outgoing, conspicuous, and ostensibly charitable late New York crime boss John Gotti. He is the son of deceased Philadelphia crime family underboss Chuckie Merlino.

With the help of boss-turned-informant Ralph Natale, Merlino was convicted of several RICO charges including racketeering, illegal gambling and extortion, in 2001, and sentenced to 14 years in prison. Since his release from prison in 2011, the FBI and organized crime reporters believe he continues to run the Philadelphia–South Jersey Mafia. Merlino disputes this, saying he has retired from a life of crime. As of 2015, Merlino divides his time between south Florida and Philadelphia.

Early life 
Merlino was born on March 13, 1962, in Philadelphia to Italian-American parents Salvatore "Chuckie" Merlino and Rita Giordano. Merlino was raised in South Philadelphia and Ventnor City, New Jersey. He is also the nephew of deceased Philadelphia crime family mobster-turned government witness Lawrence "Yogi" Merlino. Joey's sister, Maria, was briefly engaged to Salvatore Testa.

He had been friends with future made man in the Philadelphia crime family Michael "Mikey Chang" Ciancaglini and his brother Joseph "Joey Chang" Ciancaglini Jr. since attending St. Thomas Aquinas grade school in Philadelphia's Point Breeze neighborhood. Merlino's father owned and operated the 9M Bar in Southwark that Nicky Scarfo used as his criminal headquarters during his attempt to become the new boss of the Philadelphia crime family.

Criminal activity
In August 1982 at age 20, Merlino and Salvatore Scafidi, son of bookmaker Gaetano Scafidi Sr., beat and stabbed two male patrons at the Lido Restaurant in Atlantic City. In 1984 Merlino was found guilty on two counts of aggravated assault and one count of possession of a weapon for unlawful purpose. In August 1984 he was banned  by the New Jersey Casino Control Commission from New Jersey casinos. His father Salvatore would also be banned by the same commission as his son for his criminal activities on May 23, 1984. Nicky Scarfo demoted his father Salvatore from his position as underboss to soldier because of his father's alcoholism. In 1988 Salvatore was sentenced to 45 years in federal prison for two counts of racketeering and drug trafficking.

Joseph Merlino has been described as a particularly vicious person, obsessed with his own public image, and another version of New York's John Gotti. "Joey was a party guy," said mob associate Ron Previte, a police officer-turned gangster-turned government witness. "He liked to go out. He liked to gamble. He liked the high life." He invited TV crews to his annual Christmas party for the homeless, and was a fixture at the city's nightclubs, restaurants, and sporting events. Along with his longtime buddies and future mobsters, he was known to beat up people, rob people, and start fights in clubs.

On October 31, 1989, Nicky Jr., the son of imprisoned Philadelphia family boss Nicky Scarfo Sr., was shot in an Italian restaurant in Bella Vista. The younger Scarfo was shot eight times with a MAC-10, but was not hit in any vital organs. He quickly recovered and left the hospital less than two weeks later. No one was ever charged with the attempted murder, but the Federal Bureau of Investigation (FBI) and local law enforcement believe Merlino carried out the shooting to settle a score between the Scarfos and Merlinos and to show that the elder Scarfo had no more power in Philadelphia. Merlino denied any involvement and claimed he was at home under house arrest the night of the shooting. Years later when a TV reporter approached Merlino and asked about a rumoured $500,000 bounty on his life, Merlino responded "Give me the half million dollars and I’ll shoot myself."

In August 1989, Merlino was charged with interstate theft and conspiracy charges stemming from an incident where $352,000 was stolen from a Federal Armored Express truck in 1987. In January 1990, Merlino was convicted of planning the heist and sentenced to three years in prison.

Mob wars 

Merlino served his sentence at the Federal Correctional Institution, McKean, where he met mobster Ralph Natale in 1990. Natale was a longtime mobster who was serving a 15-year prison sentence for arson and drug trafficking. According to Natale, he and Merlino began plotting to take over the Philadelphia crime family during this period. Natale named Michael Ciancaglini, Steven Mazzone, George Borgesi, Gaetano "Tommy Horsehead" Scafidi and Martin Angelina as Merlino's key associates and co-conspirators in the plan. These men were all close friends of Merlino since high school and started moving in on criminal rackets in Philadelphia. When John Stanfa emerged as the new leader of the Philadelphia family in 1991, the young group of mobsters openly rebelled against him. The "Young Turks" as the press would eventually dub Merlino's tight-knit crew, struck first with the killing of Felix Bocchino on January 29, 1992. Merlino was released from prison in April 1992.

In an attempt to quell further violence, Stanfa officially inducted Merlino and his best friend Michael Ciancaglini into the crime family. Stanfa hoped he would be able to keep tabs on the Merlino crew and make it easier to kill them if necessary. While this act of diplomacy temporarily ended the violence, by 1993 an all-out war broke out between Stanfa and Merlino. On August 5, 1993, Merlino survived a drive-by shooting assassination attempt by two Stanfa gunmen, taking four bullets in the leg and buttocks, while Ciancaglini was shot in the chest and died. On August 31, 1993, a drive by shooting was performed on Stanfa and his son while they were driving on the Schuylkill Expressway. Stanfa escaped uninjured and his son survived being shot in the jaw. On September 17, 1993, a friend of Merlino's was shot and killed by Stanfa gunmen. Stanfa gunman Philip Colletti testified in court that he planted a remote control bomb under Merlino's car several times, but that it  failed to go off every time. In November 1993, Merlino was arrested by the FBI, charged with violation of his supervised release, and sent back to prison.

Mob leader
Stanfa was arrested for Racketeer Influenced and Corrupt Organizations Act violations in March 1994, was convicted in 1995, and sentenced to life in 1996. With most of Stanfa's supporters also arrested and convicted, Merlino, released from prison in November 1994, won the war and named Ralph Natale as the new boss while positioning himself as his underboss. During Natale's reign, Merlino was the real power in the family, allowing Natale to become boss to direct law enforcement attention away from himself. Nevertheless, Merlino gained notoriety as a flamboyant, celebrity gangster who often went out partying with a large entourage. The press dubbed him the John Gotti of Passyunk Avenue due to his candid demeanor in front of news cameras (Passyunk Avenue being a street in South Philadelphia). He also invited the press when he held Christmas parties for the homeless and gave away turkeys at Thanksgiving in housing projects.

The arrogance and aggressiveness of Merlino‘s young faction turned off a lot of criminals from working with the crime family. Merlino would often make big bets with bookies and refuse to pay when he lost. This practice, known as guzzling, was used on both independent and mob run bookies. During this time, Merlino and Natale oversaw the crime family's gambling, loan sharking, extortion and stolen goods rackets.

In 1995, Louis Turra, leader of the Philadelphia drug gang the 10th and Oregon crew (also known as the 10th and O gang), was severely beaten by Merlino's men, allegedly for failing to pay a Mafia street tax on the gang's illegal earnings. Angered by the beating, Turra sought vengeance. His father Anthony hosted a meeting at his house during which Anthony, Louis and his gang discussed killing Merlino. In January 1998, Louis Turra apparently hanged himself in a New York City jail while awaiting trial. In March 1998, Anthony Turra, on trial on charges of plotting to kill Merlino, was shot dead outside his home by a gunman in a black ski mask. He was shot twice as he left for the federal courthouse. "We consider this an organized crime assassination, a mob hit," Police Inspector Jerrold Kane said. Three years later, Merlino was put on trial for helping orchestrate the murder, but was acquitted.

By the late 1990s, Merlino dodged more than two dozen attempts on his life. Merlino was friends with Steve "Gorilla" Mondevergine, president of the Pagans MC motorcycle club. Merlino sometimes used the Pagans to help settle underworld disputes. During the 1990s, Merlino was also aligned with members of the Junior Black Mafia. Following Natale's arrest for parole violation in 1999, Merlino officially took over the crime family, cutting off Natale.

Racketeering conviction 
On June 28, 1999, Merlino was indicted and detained without bail on one charge of conspiracy to distribute more than five kilograms of cocaine and one charge of unlawful use of a communication facility in relation to a drug trafficking offense. The charges were later expanded to include racketeering and ordering or approving three murders and two attempted murders. Six other men were also put on trial. The prosecution's case was aided by several of Merlino's former Mafia cohorts agreeing to cooperate with the government. Natale agreed to cooperate in order to escape drug trafficking charges in 1999. Gaetano "Tommy Horsehead" Scafidi agreed to cooperate in 2000 while finishing a prison sentence due to fears that he would be murdered by Merlino's crew. Peter "the Crumb" Caprio agreed to cooperate with the government in 2000 after being charged with two murders and Ron Previte testified after becoming an undercover informant several years prior. They all testified that Natale and Merlino started a mob war to take over the Philadelphia crime family and that Merlino committed various criminal acts in the 1990s.

On July 20, 2001, the jury returned a mixed verdict. Merlino was acquitted of all three counts of murder and two counts of attempted murder;  however, he was found guilty of racketeering charges including extortion, bookmaking and receiving stolen property. Along with Merlino, six of his peers were also convicted of various racketeering related charges. On December 3, 2001, Judge Herbert J. Hutton gave Merlino a 14-year prison sentence. Commenting on his conviction, "Ain't bad," Merlino said. "Better than the death penalty." A month after the verdict, Merlino was indicted in federal court again for the 1996 murder of Joseph Sodano, despite a jury finding the murder charge "not proven" as a RICO predicate act. In March 2004, Merlino was acquitted of Sodano's murder as a violent crime in aid of racketeering.

Merlino served his prison sentence at the Federal Correctional Institution in Terre Haute, Indiana. Merlino was released from the correctional facility on March 15, 2011, after serving almost 12 years of his sentence. He was transferred to a halfway house in Florida for six months and then was on supervised release until 2015.<ref>{{cite web|title=Ex-Philly mob leader "Skinny Joey Merlino now in Florida halfway house|url=http://www.pressofatlanticcity.com/news/ap/nation/ex-philly-mob-leader-skinny-joey-merlino-now-in-florida/article_e5bf50c6-4fbc-11e0-a9aa-001cc4c002e0.html|website=Press of Atlantic City|publisher=PAC|access-date=12 March 2016|archive-date=8 January 2021|archive-url=https://web.archive.org/web/20210108214803/https://pressofatlanticcity.com/news/ap/nation/ex-philly-mob-leader-skinny-joey-merlino-now-in-florida/article_e5bf50c6-4fbc-11e0-a9aa-001cc4c002e0.html|url-status=live}}</ref> On January 4, 2015, just before his parole restrictions expired, Judge Richard Barclay Surrick gave Merlino a four-month prison sentence for violating his supervised release by meeting with organized crime figures in Florida. On April 24, 2015, Merlino was released from the Federal Detention Center, Miami after his sentence was vacated. He was released 10 days early and was free of any post-release restrictions after he won an appeal from the U.S. Court of Appeals for the Third Circuit.

 Move to Florida 
After his release in 2011, Merlino moved to Boca Raton, Florida. In a 2013 interview with George Anastasia, Merlino denied any current involvement in the Philadelphia Mafia and has stated that his life as a criminal is over. He was quoted in the interview stating "I want no part of that" and that there were "too many rats." In November 2014, Merlino opened a restaurant in Boca Raton named Merlino's'', that featured his mother's recipes. The restaurant was owned by a group of investors; Merlino is forbidden from owning an establishment that serves alcohol due to his criminal record. Instead, Merlino officially worked there as a maître d' until the restaurant closed in 2016. On September 7, 2016, the Pennsylvania Gaming Control Board banned Merlino from all casinos in Pennsylvania.

On August 4, 2016, Merlino was one of 46 people arrested up and down the East Coast in a RICO indictment. Merlino was arrested at his home in Florida and put on trial in New York City. Merlino was charged with one count of racketeering, one count of fraud and two counts of illegal gambling. Merlino was accused of entering into illegal business arrangements with New York criminals in the Genovese crime family. Merlino was also accused of taking part in a massive medical fraud scheme in Florida that had doctors prescribe patients with unnecessary (and ineffective) medical products and billing patients' insurance companies. On August 12, Merlino was released on a $5 million bond.

The other 45 men charged in the broad indictment accepted favorable plea bargains and pleaded guilty to reduced charges. Merlino refused any plea offer and went to trial on January 30, 2018. The trial concluded after two weeks of testimony. On February 20, Judge Richard J. Sullivan declared a mistrial after the jury was unable to reach a unanimous verdict on any of the four counts against Merlino. To avoid a retrial, Merlino entered into a plea deal with federal prosecutors on April 27. He agreed to plead guilty to one charge of facilitating illegal gambling transactions via an electronic device in exchange for the U.S. Attorney's Office dropping the remaining charges against him and recommending a prison sentence between 10–16 months. On October 17, Merlino was sentenced to the maximum of two years in prison. In October 2019, Merlino was granted an early release and moved to a halfway house to finish the rest of his sentence, later given supervised release in South Florida.

In January 2023, Merlino reappeared in the news when he posed for a photograph with former U.S. president Donald Trump at a Trump-owned golf club, with both men making a "thumbs up" gesture.

References

External links
"A New Nickname, A New Mob:  Philly Police Focus On Alleged Mafia Boss," 3/1/99
State of New Jersey Commission of Investigation Report, "The Changing Face of Organized Crime in New Jersey," May 2004
"Skinny Joey's Victory Party; Mob Scenes From an Italian Restaurant, 11/17/04

 

1962 births
American gangsters of Italian descent
Philadelphia crime family
Living people
American crime bosses
American prisoners and detainees
Prisoners and detainees of the United States federal government
People acquitted of murder
People convicted of racketeering
Criminals from Philadelphia
Gangsters from Philadelphia